A writing system is a method of visually representing verbal communication, based on a script and a set of rules regulating its use. While both writing and speech are useful in conveying messages, writing differs in also being a reliable form of information storage and transfer. Writing systems require shared understanding between writers and readers of the meaning behind the sets of characters that make up a script. Writing is usually recorded onto a durable medium, such as paper or electronic storage, although non-durable methods may also be used, such as writing on a computer display, on a blackboard, in sand, or by skywriting. Reading a text can be accomplished purely in the mind as an internal process, or expressed orally.

Writing systems can be placed into broad categories such as alphabets, syllabaries, or logographies, although any particular system may have attributes of more than one category. In the alphabetic category, a standard set of letters represent speech sounds. In a syllabary, each symbol correlates to a syllable or mora. In a logography, each character represents a semantic unit such as a word or morpheme. Abjads differ from alphabets in that vowels are not indicated, and in abugidas or alphasyllabaries each character represents a consonant–vowel pairing.

Alphabets typically use a set of less than 100 symbols to fully express a language, whereas syllabaries can have several hundred, and logographies can have thousands of symbols. Many writing systems also include a special set of symbols known as punctuation which is used to aid interpretation and help capture nuances and variations in the message's meaning that are communicated verbally by cues in timing, tone, accent, inflection or intonation.

Writing systems were preceded by proto-writing, which used pictograms, ideograms and other mnemonic symbols. Proto-writing lacked the ability to capture and express a full range of thoughts and ideas. The invention of writing systems, which dates back to the beginning of the Bronze Age in the late Neolithic Era of the late 4th millennium BC, enabled the accurate durable recording of human history in a manner that was not prone to the same types of error to which oral history is vulnerable. Soon after, writing provided a reliable form of long distance communication. With the advent of publishing, it provided the medium for an early form of mass communication.

General  properties 

Writing systems are distinguished from other possible symbolic communication systems in that a writing system is always associated with at least one spoken language. In contrast, visual representations such as drawings, paintings, and non-verbal items on maps, such as contour lines, are not language-related. Some symbols on information signs, such as the symbols for male and female, are also not language related, but can grow to become part of language if they are often used in conjunction with other language elements. Some other symbols, such as numerals and the ampersand, are not directly linked to any specific language, but are often used in writing and thus must be considered part of writing systems.

Every human community possesses language, which many regard as an innate and defining condition of humanity. However, the development of writing systems, and the process by which they have supplanted traditional oral systems of communication, have been sporadic, uneven and slow. Once established, writing systems generally change more slowly than their spoken counterparts. Thus they often preserve features and expressions which are no longer current in the spoken language. One of the great benefits of writing systems is that they can preserve a permanent record of information expressed in a language.

All writing systems require:
 at least one set of defined base elements or symbols, individually termed signs and collectively called a script;
 at least one set of rules and conventions (orthography) understood and shared by a community, which assigns meaning to the base elements (graphemes), their ordering and relations to one another;
 at least one language (generally spoken) whose constructions are represented and can be recalled by the interpretation of these elements and rules;
 some physical means of distinctly representing the symbols by application to a permanent or semi-permanent medium, so they may be interpreted (usually visually, but tactile systems have also been devised).

Basic terminology 

In the examination of individual scripts, the study of writing systems has developed along partially independent lines. Thus, the terminology employed differs somewhat from field to field.

Text, writing, reading and orthography 
The generic term text refers to an instance of written or spoken material with the former having been transcribed in some way. The act of composing and recording a text may be referred to as writing, and the act of viewing and interpreting the text as reading. Orthography refers to the method and rules of observed writing structure (literal meaning, "correct writing"), and particularly for alphabetic systems, includes the concept of spelling.

Grapheme and phoneme 

A grapheme is a specific base unit of a writing system. They are the minimally significant elements which taken together comprise the set of "building blocks" out of which texts made up of one or more writing systems may be constructed, along with rules of correspondence and use. The concept is similar to that of the phoneme used in the study of spoken languages. For example, in the Latin-based writing system of standard contemporary English, examples of graphemes include the majuscule and minuscule forms of the twenty-six letters of the alphabet (corresponding to various phonemes), marks of punctuation (mostly non-phonemic), and a few other symbols such as those for numerals (logograms for numbers).

An individual grapheme may be represented in a wide variety of ways, where each variation is visually distinct in some regard, but all are interpreted as representing the "same" grapheme. These individual variations are known as allographs of a grapheme (compare with the term allophone used in linguistic study). For example, the minuscule letter a has different allographs when written as a cursive, block, or typed letter. The choice of a particular allograph may be influenced by the medium used, the writing instrument, the stylistic choice of the writer, the preceding and following graphemes in the text, the time available for writing, the intended audience, and the largely unconscious features of an individual's handwriting.

Glyph, sign and character 
The terms glyph, sign and character are sometimes used to refer to a grapheme. Common usage varies from discipline to discipline; compare cuneiform sign, Maya glyph, Chinese character. The glyphs of most writing systems are made up of lines (or strokes) and are therefore called linear, but there are glyphs in non-linear writing systems made up of other types of marks, such as Cuneiform and Braille.

Complete and partial writing systems 
Writing systems may be regarded as complete according to the extent to which they are able to represent all that may be expressed in the spoken language, while a partial writing system is limited in what it can convey.

Writing systems, languages and conceptual systems 
Writing systems can be independent from languages, one can have multiple writing systems for a language, e.g., Hindustani; and one can also have one writing system for multiple languages, e.g., the Arabic script. Chinese characters were also borrowed by other countries as their early writing systems, e.g., the early writing systems of Vietnamese language until the beginning of the 20th century.

To represent a conceptual system, one uses one or more languages, e.g., mathematics is a conceptual system and one may use first-order logic and a natural language together in representation.

History 

Writing systems were preceded by proto-writing, systems of ideographic and/or early mnemonic symbols. The best-known examples are:
 "Token system", a recording system used for accounting purposes in Mesopotamia c. 9000 BC
 Jiahu symbols, carved on tortoise shells in Jiahu, c. 6600 BC
 Vinča symbols (Tărtăria tablets), c. 5300 BC
 Proto-Cuneiform c. 3500 BC
 Possibly the early Indus script, c. 3500 BC, as its nature is disputed
 Nsibidi script, c. before 500 AD

The invention of the first writing systems is roughly contemporary with the beginning of the Bronze Age (following the late Neolithic) in the late 4th millennium BC. The Sumerian archaic cuneiform script closely followed by the Egyptian hieroglyphs are generally considered the earliest writing systems, both emerging out of their ancestral proto-literate symbol systems from 3400 to 3200 BC with earliest coherent texts from about 2600 BC. It is generally agreed that the historically earlier Sumerian writing was an independent invention; however, it is debated whether Egyptian writing was developed completely independently of Sumerian, or was a case of cultural diffusion.

A similar debate exists for the Chinese script, which developed around 1200 BC. The Chinese script is probably an independent invention, because there is no evidence of contact between China and the literate civilizations of the Near East, and because of the distinct differences between the Mesopotamian and Chinese approaches to logography and phonetic representation.

The pre-Columbian Mesoamerican writing systems (including among others Olmec and Maya scripts) are generally believed to have had independent origins.

A hieroglyphic writing system used by pre-colonial Mi'kmaq, which was observed by missionaries from the 17th to 19th centuries, is thought to have developed independently. There is some debate over whether or not this was a fully formed system or just a series of mnemonic pictographs.

It is thought that the first consonantal alphabetic writing appeared before 2000 BC, as a representation of language developed by Semitic tribes in the Sinai Peninsula (see History of the alphabet). Most other alphabets in the world today either descended from this one innovation, many via the Phoenician alphabet, or were directly inspired by its design.

The first true alphabet is the Greek script which consistently represents vowels since 800 BC. The Latin alphabet, a direct descendant, is by far the most common writing system in use.

Functional classification 

Several approaches have been taken to classify writing systems, the most common and basic one being a broad division into three categories: logographic, syllabic, and alphabetic (or segmental); however, all three may be found in any given writing system in varying proportions, often making it difficult to categorise a system uniquely. The term complex system is sometimes used to describe those where the admixture makes classification problematic. Modern linguists regard such approaches, including Diringer's
 pictographic script
 ideographic script
 analytic transitional script
 phonetic script
 alphabetic script
as too simplistic, often considering the categories to be incomparable.
Hill split writing into three major categories of linguistic analysis, one of which covers discourses and is not usually considered writing proper:
 discourse system
 iconic discourse system, e.g. Amerindian
 conventional discourse system, e.g. Quipu
 morphemic writing system, e.g. Egyptian, Sumerian, Maya, Chinese, Anatolian Hieroglyphs
 phonemic writing system
 partial phonemic writing system, e.g. Egyptian, Hebrew, Arabic
 poly-phonemic writing system, e.g. Linear B, Kana, Cherokee
 mono-phonemic writing system
 phonemic writing system, e.g. Ancient Greek, Old English
 morpho-phonemic writing system, e.g. German, Modern English
Sampson draws a distinction between semasiography and glottography
 semasiography, relating visible marks to meaning directly without reference to any specific spoken language
 glottography, using visible marks to represent forms of a spoken language
 logography, representing a spoken language by assigning distinctive visible marks to linguistic elements of André Martinet's "first articulation" (Martinet 1949), i.e. morphemes or words
 phonography, achieving the same goal by assigning marks to elements of the "second articulation", e.g. phonemes, syllables
DeFrancis, criticizing Sampson's introduction of semasiographic writing and featural alphabets stresses the phonographic quality of writing proper
 pictures
 nonwriting
 writing
 rebus
 syllabic systems
 pure syllabic, e.g. Linear B, Yi, Kana, Cherokee
 , e.g. Sumerian, Chinese, Mayan
 consonantal
 morpho-consonantal, e.g. Egyptian
 pure consonantal, e.g. Phoenician
 alphabetic
 pure phonemic, e.g. Greek
 morpho-phonemic, e.g. English
Faber categorizes phonographic writing by two levels, linearity and coding:
 logographic, e.g. Chinese, Ancient Egyptian
 phonographic
 syllabically linear
 syllabically coded, e.g. Kana, Akkadian
 segmentally coded, e.g. Hebrew, Syriac, Arabic, Ethiopian, Amharic, Devanagari
 segmentally linear
 complete (alphabet), e.g. Greco-Latin, Cyrillic
 defective, e.g. Ugaritic, Phoenician, Aramaic, Old South Arabian, Paleo-Hebrew

Logographic systems 

A logogram is a single written character which represents a complete grammatical word. Chinese characters are type examples of logograms.

As each character represents a single word (or, more precisely, a morpheme), many logograms are required to write all the words of language. The vast array of logograms and the memorization of what they mean are considered by some as major disadvantages of logographic systems over alphabetic systems. However, since the meaning is inherent to the symbol, the same logographic system can theoretically be used to represent different languages. In practice, the ability to communicate across languages works best for the closely related varieties of Chinese, and only to a lesser extent for other languages, as differences in syntax reduce the crosslinguistic portability of a given logographic system.

Japanese uses Chinese logograms extensively in its writing systems, with most of the symbols carrying the same or similar meanings. However, the grammatical differences between Japanese and Chinese are significant enough that a long Chinese text is not readily understandable to a Japanese reader without any knowledge of basic Chinese grammar, though short and concise phrases such as those on signs and newspaper headlines are much easier to comprehend. Similarly, a Chinese reader can get a general idea of what a long Japanese text means but usually cannot understand the text fully.

While most languages do not use wholly logographic writing systems, many languages use some logograms. A good example of modern western logograms are the Arabic numerals: everyone who uses those symbols understands what 1 means whether they call it one, eins, uno, yi, ichi, ehad, ena, or jedan. Other western logograms include the ampersand &, used for and, the at sign @, used in many contexts for at, the percent sign % and the many signs representing units of currency ($, ¢, €, £, ¥ and so on.)

Logograms are sometimes called ideograms, a word that refers to symbols which graphically represent abstract ideas, but linguists avoid this use, as Chinese characters are often semantic–phonetic compounds, symbols which include an element that represents the meaning and a phonetic complement element that represents the pronunciation. Some nonlinguists distinguish between lexigraphy and ideography, where symbols in lexigraphies represent words and symbols in ideographies represent words or morphemes.

The most important (and, to a degree, the only surviving) modern logographic writing system is the Chinese one, whose characters have been used with varying degrees of modification in varieties of Chinese, Japanese, Korean, Vietnamese, and other east Asian languages. Ancient Egyptian hieroglyphs and the Mayan writing system are also systems with certain logographic features, although they have marked phonetic features as well and are no longer in current use. Vietnamese switched to the Latin alphabet in the 20th century and the use of Chinese characters in Korean is increasingly rare. The Japanese writing system includes several distinct forms of writing including logography.

Syllabic systems: syllabary 

Another type of writing system with systematic syllabic linear symbols, the abugidas, is discussed below as well.

As logographic writing systems use a single symbol for an entire word, a syllabary is a set of written symbols that represent (or approximate) syllables, which make up words. A symbol in a syllabary typically represents a consonant sound followed by a vowel sound, or just a vowel alone.

In a "true syllabary", there is no systematic graphic similarity between phonetically related characters (though some do have graphic similarity for the vowels). More recent creations such as the Cree syllabary embody a system of varying signs, which can best be seen when arranging the syllabogram set in an onset–coda or onset–rime table.

Syllabaries are best suited to languages with relatively simple syllable structure, such as Japanese. The English language, on the other hand, allows complex syllable structures, with a relatively large inventory of vowels and complex consonant clusters, making it cumbersome to write English words with a syllabary. To write English using a syllabary, every possible syllable in English would have to have a separate symbol, and whereas the number of possible syllables in Japanese is around 100, in English there are approximately 15,000 to 16,000.

However, syllabaries with much larger inventories do exist. The Yi script, for example, contains 756 different symbols (or 1,164, if symbols with a particular tone diacritic are counted as separate syllables, as in Unicode). The Chinese script, when used to write Middle Chinese and the modern varieties of Chinese, also represents syllables, and includes separate glyphs for nearly all of the many thousands of syllables in Middle Chinese; however, because it primarily represents morphemes and includes different characters to represent homophonous morphemes with different meanings, it is normally considered a logographic script rather than a syllabary.

Other languages that use true syllabaries include Mycenaean Greek (Linear B) and Indigenous languages of the Americas such as Cherokee. Several languages of the Ancient Near East used forms of cuneiform, which is a syllabary with some non-syllabic elements.

Segmental systems: alphabets 

An alphabet is a small set of letters (basic written symbols), each of which roughly represents or represented historically a segmental phoneme of a spoken language. The word alphabet is derived from alpha and beta, the first two symbols of the Greek alphabet.

The first type of alphabet that was developed was the abjad. An abjad is an alphabetic writing system where there is one symbol per consonant. Abjads differ from other alphabets in that they have characters only for consonantal sounds. Vowels are not usually marked in abjads. All known abjads (except maybe Tifinagh) belong to the Semitic family of scripts, and derive from the original Northern Linear Abjad. The reason for this is that Semitic languages and the related Berber languages have a morphemic structure which makes the denotation of vowels redundant in most cases.

Some abjads, like Arabic and Hebrew, have markings for vowels as well. However, they use them only in special contexts, such as for teaching. Many scripts derived from abjads have been extended with vowel symbols to become full alphabets. Of these, the most famous example is the derivation of the Greek alphabet from the Phoenician abjad. This has mostly happened when the script was adapted to a non-Semitic language. The term abjad takes its name from the old order of the Arabic alphabet's consonants 'alif, bā', jīm, dāl, though the word may have earlier roots in Phoenician or Ugaritic. "Abjad" is still the word for alphabet in Arabic, Malay and Indonesian.

An abugida is an alphabetic writing system whose basic signs denote consonants with an inherent vowel and where consistent modifications of the basic sign indicate other following vowels than the inherent one. Thus, in an abugida there may or may not be a sign for "k" with no vowel, but also one for "ka" (if "a" is the inherent vowel), and "ke" is written by modifying the "ka" sign in a way that is consistent with how one would modify "la" to get "le". In many abugidas the modification is the addition of a vowel sign, but other possibilities are imaginable (and used), such as rotation of the basic sign, addition of diacritical marks and so on.

The contrast with "true syllabaries" is that the latter have one distinct symbol per possible syllable, and the signs for each syllable have no systematic graphic similarity. The graphic similarity of most abugidas comes from the fact that they are derived from abjads, and the consonants make up the symbols with the inherent vowel and the new vowel symbols are markings added on to the base symbol. In the Ge'ez script, for which the linguistic term abugida was named, the vowel modifications do not always appear systematic, although they originally were more so.

Canadian Aboriginal syllabics can be considered abugidas, although they are rarely thought of in those terms. The largest single group of abugidas is the Brahmic family of scripts, however, which includes nearly all the scripts used in India and Southeast Asia. The name abugida is derived from the first four characters of an order of the Ge'ez script used in some contexts. It was borrowed from Ethiopian languages as a linguistic term by Peter T. Daniels.

Featural systems 

A featural script represents finer detail than an alphabet. Here symbols do not represent whole phonemes, but rather the elements (features) that make up the phonemes, such as voicing or its place of articulation. Theoretically, each feature could be written with a separate letter; and abjads or abugidas, or indeed syllabaries, could be featural, but the only prominent system of this sort is Korean hangul. In hangul, the featural symbols are combined into alphabetic letters, and these letters are in turn joined into syllabic blocks, so that the system combines three levels of phonological representation.

Many scholars, e.g. John DeFrancis, reject this class or at least labeling hangul as such. The Korean script is a conscious script creation by literate experts, which Daniels calls a "sophisticated grammatogeny". These include stenographies and constructed scripts of hobbyists and fiction writers (such as Tengwar), many of which feature advanced graphic designs corresponding to phonologic properties. The basic unit of writing in these systems can map to anything from phonemes to words. It has been shown that even the Latin script has sub-character "features".

Ambiguous systems 
Most writing systems are not purely one type. The English writing system, for example, includes numerals and other logograms such as #, $, and &, and the written language often does not match well with the spoken one. As mentioned above, all logographic systems have phonetic components as well, whether along the lines of a syllabary, such as Chinese ("logo-syllabic"), or an abjad, as in Egyptian ("logo-consonantal").

Some scripts, however, are truly ambiguous. The semi-syllabaries of ancient Spain were syllabic for plosives such as p, t, k, but alphabetic for other consonants. In some versions, vowels were written redundantly after syllabic letters, conforming to an alphabetic orthography. Old Persian cuneiform was similar. Of 23 consonants (including null), seven were fully syllabic, thirteen were purely alphabetic, and for the other three, there was one letter for /Cu/ and another for both /Ca/ and /Ci/. However, all vowels were written overtly regardless; as in the Brahmic abugidas, the /Ca/ letter was used for a bare consonant.

The zhuyin phonetic glossing script for Chinese divides syllables in two or three, but into onset, medial, and rime rather than consonant and vowel. Pahawh Hmong is similar, but can be considered to divide syllables into either onset-rime or consonant-vowel (all consonant clusters and diphthongs are written with single letters); as the latter, it is equivalent to an abugida but with the roles of consonant and vowel reversed. Other scripts are intermediate between the categories of alphabet, abjad and abugida, so there may be disagreement on how they should be classified.

Graphic classification 
Perhaps the primary graphic distinction made in classifications is that of linearity. Linear writing systems are those in which the characters are composed of lines, such as the Latin alphabet and Chinese characters. Chinese characters are considered linear whether they are written with a ball-point pen or a calligraphic brush, or cast in bronze. Similarly, Egyptian hieroglyphs and Maya glyphs were often painted in linear outline form, but in formal contexts they were carved in bas-relief. The earliest examples of writing are linear: the Sumerian script of c. 3300 BC was linear, though its cuneiform descendants were not. Non-linear systems, on the other hand, such as braille, are not composed of lines, no matter what instrument is used to write them.

Cuneiform was probably the earliest non-linear writing. Its glyphs were formed by pressing the end of a reed stylus into moist clay, not by tracing lines in the clay with the stylus as had been done previously. The result was a radical transformation of the appearance of the script.

Braille is a non-linear adaptation of the Latin alphabet that completely abandoned the Latin forms. The letters are composed of raised bumps on the writing substrate, which can be leather (Louis Braille's original material), stiff paper, plastic or metal.

There are also transient non-linear adaptations of the Latin alphabet, including Morse code, the manual alphabets of various sign languages, and semaphore, in which flags or bars are positioned at prescribed angles. However, if "writing" is defined as a potentially permanent means of recording information, then these systems do not qualify as writing at all, since the symbols disappear as soon as they are used. (Instead, these transient systems serve as signals.)

Directionality 

Scripts are graphically characterized by the direction in which they are written. Egyptian hieroglyphs were written either left to right or right to left, with the animal and human glyphs turned to face the beginning of the line. The early alphabet could be written in multiple directions: horizontally (side to side), or vertically (up or down). Prior to standardization, alphabetical writing was done both left-to-right (LTR or sinistrodextrally) and right-to-left (RTL or dextrosinistrally). It was most commonly written boustrophedonically: starting in one (horizontal) direction, then turning at the end of the line and reversing direction.

The Greek alphabet and its successors settled on a left-to-right pattern, from the top to the bottom of the page. Other scripts, such as Arabic and Hebrew, came to be written right-to-left. Scripts that historically incorporate Chinese characters (including Japanese, Korean and Vietnamese etc.) have traditionally been written vertically (top-to-bottom), from the right to the left of the page, but nowadays are frequently written left-to-right, top-to-bottom, due to Western influence, a growing need to accommodate terms in the Latin script, and technical limitations in popular electronic document formats.

Chinese characters sometimes, as in signage, especially when signifying something old or traditional, may also be written from right to left. The Old Uyghur alphabet and its descendants are unique in being written top-to-bottom, left-to-right; this direction originated from an ancestral Semitic direction by rotating the page 90° counter-clockwise to conform to the appearance of vertical Chinese writing.

Several scripts used in the Philippines and Indonesia, such as Hanunó'o, are traditionally written with lines moving away from the writer, from bottom to top, but are read horizontally left to right; however, Kulitan, another Philippine script, is written top to bottom and right to left. Ogham is written bottom to top and read vertically, commonly on the corner of a stone. The ancient Libyco-Berber alphabet was also written from bottom to top.

Left-to-right writing has the advantage that since most people are right-handed, the hand does not interfere with the just-written text, which might not yet have dried, since the hand is on the right side of the pen. Right-to-left writing has been claimed to advantageous back when writing was done with hammer and chisel; the scribe would hold the hammer in his right hand and chisel in his left, and going right-to-left would mean his left hand was resting on the smooth, uncut area.

On computers 

In computers and telecommunication systems, writing systems are generally not codified as such, but graphemes and other grapheme-like units that are required for text processing are represented by "characters" that typically manifest in encoded form. There are many character encoding standards and related technologies, such as ISO/IEC 8859-1 (a character repertoire and encoding scheme oriented toward the Latin script), CJK (Chinese, Japanese, Korean) and bi-directional text.

Today, many such standards are re-defined in a collective standard, the ISO/IEC 10646 "Universal Character Set", and a parallel, closely related expanded work, The Unicode Standard. Both are generally encompassed by the term Unicode. In Unicode, each character, in every language's writing system, is (simplifying slightly) given a unique identification number, known as its code point. Computer operating systems use code points to look up characters in the font file, so the characters can be displayed on the page or screen.

A keyboard is the device most commonly used for writing via computer. Each key is associated with a standard code which the keyboard sends to the computer when it is pressed. By using a combination of alphabetic keys with modifier keys such as Ctrl, Alt, Shift and AltGr, various character codes are generated and sent to the CPU. The operating system intercepts and converts those signals to the appropriate characters based on the keyboard layout and input method, and then delivers those converted codes and characters to the running application software, which in turn looks up the appropriate glyph in the currently used font file, and requests the operating system to draw these on the screen.

See also 

 List of writing systems
 Constructed script
 Calligraphy
 Defective script
 Digraphia
 Epigraphy
 Formal language
 Grammatology
 International phonetic alphabet
 ISO 15924
 Orthography
 Pasigraphy
 Penmanship
 Paleography
 Phonemic orthography
 Phonetic transcription
 Numeral system
 Transliteration
 Transcription (linguistics)
 Writing
 Written language
 X-SAMPA

References

Sources 

 Cisse, Mamadou. 2006. "Ecrits et écritures en Afrique de l'Ouest". Sudlangues n°6, Ecrits et écriture en Afrique de l’Ouest
 Coulmas, Florian. 1996. The Blackwell encyclopedia of writing systems. Oxford: Blackwell.
 Coulmas, Florian. 2003. Writing systems. An introduction. Cambridge: Cambridge University Press.
 Daniels, Peter T, and William Bright, eds. 1996. The World's Writing Systems. Oxford University Press. .
 DeFrancis, John. 1990. The Chinese Language: Fact and Fantasy. Honolulu: University of Hawaii Press. 
 
 Hannas, William. C. 1997. Asia's Orthographic Dilemma. University of Hawaii Press.  (paperback);  (hardcover)
 
 Nishiyama, Yutaka. 2010. The Mathematics of Direction in Writing. International Journal of Pure and Applied Mathematics, Vol.61, No.3, 347-356.
 Rogers, Henry. 2005. Writing Systems: A Linguistic Approach. Oxford: Blackwell.  (hardcover);  (paperback)
 Sampson, Geoffrey. 1985. Writing Systems. Stanford, California: Stanford University Press.  (paper),  (cloth).
 Smalley, W. A. (ed.) 1964. Orthography studies: articles on new writing systems. London: United Bible Society.

External links 

 decodeunicode Unicode Wiki with all 98,884 Unicode 5.0 characters as gifs in three sizes
 The World’s Writing Systems, All 294 known writing systems, each with a typographic reference glyph and Unicode status
 African writing systems
 Omniglot: The Online Encyclopedia of Writing Systems and Languages
 Ancient Scripts Introduction to different writing systems
 Alphabets of Europe
 Elian script a writing system that combines the linearity of spelling with the free-form aspects of drawing.

Writing
 
Typography